Bismarck brown may refer to:

 Bismarck brown R, basic brown 4
 Bismarck brown Y, basic brown 1